Phoenix Karaka (born 6 November 1993) is a New Zealand netball international. She was a member of the New Zealand teams that won the 2019 Netball World Cup. Christine Papali'i is her mother.

Career 
Following her success at secondary school level at Auckland Girls' Grammar School, Karaka rose through the ranks at age group level as a part of both the NZ Secondary Schools and NZ Under-21 teams, including the victorious Under-21 side at the Youth World Cup in Glasgow in 2013.

Karaka signed her first professional contract with Southern Steel for the 2013 ANZ Championship, and remained a part of the Steel for the next three seasons before signing with the Central Pulse in 2016 after consistently impressive performances, including being ranked 3rd overall for intercepts in the 2015 ANZ Championship.
She captained Northern Mystics in 2019 and 2020. but pulled out the following year due to pregnancy

International 
Karaka made her debut for New Zealand on their 2014 Tour of the UK where she was initially selected as a training partner, however was soon promoted to the main squad following injury concerns to Casey Kopua. She participated in the exhibition games against Scotland and England A, before making her test debut off as a substitute in the final stages of the Silver Fern's 17-goal victory over England on 20 January 2014.
Karaka made a triumphant return after earning her spot in the 2019 Netball World Cup winning team.  Karaka again returned following the birth of her daughter to the 2022 Netball Quad Series

Karaka was named in the team of 12 for the  2022 Commonwealth Games.

Personal life 

Phoenix Karaka's partner is All Black Patrick Tuipulotu

References 

1993 births
Living people
New Zealand netball players
New Zealand international netball players
Central Pulse players
Southern Steel players
2019 Netball World Cup players
2015 Netball World Cup players
Northern Mystics players
Netball players from Auckland
ANZ Premiership players
ANZ Championship players
People educated at Auckland Girls' Grammar School
Commonwealth Games bronze medallists for New Zealand
Commonwealth Games medallists in netball
Netball players at the 2022 Commonwealth Games
Medallists at the 2022 Commonwealth Games
New Zealand international Fast5 players